This is a list of active duty United States Air Force major generals collected from publicly available and accessible information.

Joint positions

Department of Defense

Defense Agencies

Joint Staff

Unified Combatant Commands

National Guard

Other joint positions

United States Air Force

Department of the Air Force

Air Staff

Air Force major commands

Direct headquarters staff

Subordinate commands

Field Operating Agencies

Direct reporting units

Operating forces

Air National Guard

United States Space Force

List of pending appointments

Retaining current position/position unannounced

See also
List of active duty United States four-star officers
List of active duty United States three-star officers
List of active duty United States Marine Corps major generals
List of active duty United States rear admirals
List of active duty United States Space Force general officers
List of active duty United States senior enlisted leaders and advisors
List of current United States National Guard major generals
List of United States Army four-star generals
List of United States Marine Corps four-star generals
List of United States Navy four-star admirals
List of United States Air Force four-star generals
List of United States Coast Guard four-star admirals

References

Notes

United States Air Force generals
United States Air Force
Air Force
Two-star officers
United States Air Force major generals